Michael Piazza may refer to:

Mike Piazza, former Major League Baseball catcher
Michael S. Piazza, author and social justice advocate